"Can't We Just Sit Down (And Talk It Over)" is a song by Tony Macaulay made famous by American singer Donna Summer, appearing on her album I Remember Yesterday (1977). Summer's version of the song is an R&B ballad, and was released as a single in certain countries in 1977. However, the disco B-side, "I Feel Love" caused such a stir that it was changed to the A-side – it became a landmark song in electronic dance music. "Can't We Just Sit Down (And Talk It Over)" rose to #20 on the R&B chart, the first time one of Summer's singles had done so since "Love to Love You Baby" (1975).

Record World said that "Summer demonstrates an impressive versatility with this slow, melodic ballad, sans erotic sound effects, that showcases a good, soulful singing voice."

Also in 1977, American soul singer Bill Brandon recorded a version of the song for his self-titled album, released on Prelude Records. The next year, British singer Linda Lewis recorded the song for release as a 45 rpm single.

Weekly charts

References

External links
Lyrics to Bill Brandon version

1970s ballads
Donna Summer songs
Songs written by Tony Macaulay
1977 singles
1977 songs
Casablanca Records singles
Song recordings produced by Giorgio Moroder
Song recordings produced by Pete Bellotte
Rhythm and blues ballads